Tapura letestui is a species of plant in the Dichapetalaceae family. It is found in the Republic of the Congo and Gabon.

References

Vulnerable plants
letestui
Taxonomy articles created by Polbot
Taxa named by François Pellegrin